German Afghans are German citizens with Afghan ancestry and non-citizen residents born in, or with ancestors from, Afghanistan. It is the largest Afghan community in Europe and part of the worldwide Afghan diaspora, of which it is one of the largest. In 2019, the Federal Statistical Office of Germany estimated the number of people of Afghan descent residing in Germany at 253,000, making it the ninth largest foreign background community in the country, the third largest from outside the EU, and the largest group from Asia excluding the Middle East and Caucusus. In particular, there are 35,805 Afghans in Hamburg alone (as of 2015). Offenbach am Main and Hamburg had the highest shares of Afghan migrants among all German districts in 2011. There were 51,000 people of Afghan decent living in Hamburg in 2023. 

The Afghan community in Germany is heterogeneous with various political views, as they are in Afghanistan (see Demography of Afghanistan). Though with the NATO involvement in Afghanistan, the community has come closer together due to shared hopes and worries; however, there are relatively few representative associations or organizations.

History
In the 1970s, about 2,000 Afghans resided in West Germany, most were businessmen and students. The trade city of Hamburg particularly attracted Afghan carpet traders who would sell Afghan carpets. With the onset of the Soviet-Afghan War in Afghanistan, many fled to West Germany and the population grew to about 11,000 by 1982. Another wave started in the 1990s and the Afghan population reached about 50,000 by 1994.

Germany forms one of the biggest Afghan diaspora communities in the world. It was estimated that the population numbered around 70,000 as of 2001.

Following the European migrant crisis, the community rapidly expanded, numbering 253,000 in 2016, up from 75,000 in 2014. Afghanistan was one of the main sources of migration to the region, while Germany was the most prominent destination.

In late December 2016, Germany decided to repatriate 11,900 Afghans back to their home country, what is known as Second collective deportation.

Thousands of Afghans came to Germany following the withdrawal of German training forces in Afghanistan in 2021. They are mostly people who worked with the German army or German aid agencies in Afghanistan. 
While in 2011 circa 56,500 Afghan citizens  resided in Germany, the number increased to 253,500 in 2016 and to 377,000 in 2022.  These numbers only reflect Afghans holding Afghan citzenship. There were 351,000 people (called people with migration background in German) of Afghan decent living in Germany as of 2021.

Demography
Under the definitions of the German Federal Statistics Office, Afghan citizens who choose to obtain German citizenship will have their "statistical" migration background gone, meaning second or third generation immigrants are not put under the definition. Of the approximately 156,000 Germans of Afghan descent, around 25,000 had a German or some other non-Afghan passport.
As of 2023, there are 377,00 Afghan citizens residing in Germany.

Age and gender
Historically most Afghans came to Germany as families. From 2012 there was a rising number of Afghan asylum seekers and a shifting trend to individual arrivals of Afghan men, rather than whole families. The migrants in the 2010s period were predominantly male, significantly shifting the gender balance. As of 2015, 44,778 (34.1%) of 25 to 35 year old Afghans in Germany were women. The male-female ratio is somewhat balanced for adults over 35 and children under 15, but in those between 15 and 35 there is a huge male surplus.

Distribution

In 2008 Hamburg had the highest Afghan diasporic population of any city in the continent, with 7,000 German citizens of Afghan origin and 14,000 other residents of Afghan origin. Immigration began with the start of the Soviet–Afghan War in 1979 and additional immigration came after its end. Due to the differing origins and political affiliations of the émigrés,  et al. wrote in Der Spiegel that "Hamburg's Afghan community was relatively loose-knit and was rarely perceived as an ethnic group, partly because these immigrants had been so deeply divided at home that there was little left to unite them as a community abroad." Therefore, the residents focused internally on their own families and keeping them together.

The large Afghan community in Hamburg make the city feel like home to many German Afghans, despite the low-lying port city contrasting to the mountainous and landlocked Afghanistan.

The single state with the most Afghan citizens as of 2017 was Bavaria followed by Hesse and North Rhine Westphalia. The community predominantly resides in territory belonging to the former West Germany. While Hamburg continues to have the highest concentration of Afghans, the population is now more spread out in the country than before, and by 2015 all states in former East Germany had numbers in the thousands.

Employment
Of the 1,256 Afghan students enrolled at universities in the 2015/2016 period, the majority enrolled in engineering programmes and a large number also enrolled in law. This was followed by smaller numbers in sciences, humanities and health, and even smaller in agricultural, sport and art programmes.

Religion 
Most Germans with Afghan heritage are Muslims. There is also a small population of Afghan Hindus, Sikhs, Christians, Jews and nonreligious in Germany. There are 24 Afghan cultural and religious associations in Germany, most being Islamic, four Hindu, and one Sikh.

Community and social issues

Many of the early Afghan migrants were well-educated and professionally trained in Afghanistan, however they found difficulties finding work in their professional fields. Over years the backgrounds of the migrants have become more diverse, and the more recent ones tend to be less educated or professionally trained by comparison.

Some Afghans in Germany feel their representation in society is limited, despite it being one of the country's largest immigrant groups.

Associations include the Afghan-German Association for Education, Health and Crafts founded in 2002, the Afghanistan Information Center founded in 1993, and the Afghan Women's Association founded in 1992. About 130 association with clear connections to Afghanistan have been identified in Germany as of 2017. These comprise groups mainly related to politics and integration, education and social affairs, culture, religion and health.

From 1998 to 2011 the privately owned Afghan Museum operated in Hamburg's Speicherstadt district.

In 2016 there were 157 underage individuals of Afghan origin in child marriages according to the interior ministry.

Notable people 

 Abdul Ahad Momand, cosmonaut
 Burhan Qurbani, film director
Djelaludin Sharityar, footballer
Dorranai Hassan, footballer
 Graziella Schazad, singer-songwriter
Hamid Rahimi, boxer
Hassan Amin, footballer
Kabir Stori, Pashto poet and writer
 Mina Tander, actress
Nadiem Amiri, footballer
Nasrat Haqparast, mixed martial artist
Nina Tenge, rapper
Rebecca Mir, model
Sayed Sadaat, former politician in Afghanistan
Seeta Qasemi, singer-songwriter of Afghan music
Simin Tander, jazz musician
Zallascht Sadat, model
Zohre Esmaeli, model
 Izatullah Dawlatzai
 Khaibar Amani
 Abassin Alikhil
 Mustafa Hadid
 Josef Shirdel
 Massih Wassey
 Milad Salem
 Masih Saighani
 Benjamin Nadjem
 Yusuf Barak
 Ahmad Milad Karimi
 Morsal Obeidi
 Ata Yamrali
 Sandjar Ahmadi
 Zamir Daudi
 Mansur Faqiryar
Rangin Dadfar Spanta
Sulaiman Layeq

See also 
Afghanistan–Germany relations
Afghans in the Netherlands
Afghans in Denmark
Afghans in the United Kingdom
Afghans in France
Afghans in Italy
Afghans in Switzerland
Afghans in Norway
Afghans in Sweden
Afghan Americans
Afghan Canadians
Afghan Australians
Afghan New Zealanders

References 

Afghan diaspora in Europe
Asian diaspora in Germany
Islam in Germany
Muslim communities in Europe
Afghanistan–Germany relations
German people of Afghan descent